Brown Peak is a peak located in Kern County, California.

Brown Peak is named for Charlie Brown, a miner who lived in the area during the early 1900s.

References 

Mountains of the Sierra Nevada (United States)